Shanghaixi (Shanghai West) railway station is a railway station in the Putuo District of Shanghai which in the past, lost its importance as a result of Shanghai railway station further to the east. It has, however, been recently redeveloped.

History
Built in 1905, the station was originally known as Jessfield railway station, then  Zhenru railway station until 1989. Destinations of departing trains included Yantai, Zaozhuang, Hengyang, Ganzhou (Jinggangshan) and Chengdu, as well as a direct train from Shanghai to Zhangjiajie. The station lost importance as most trains stopped at Shanghai railway station instead to the east, and the station was closed down for renovation works on July 1, 2006, with the opening of the newly renovated Shanghai South railway station.

, the station has been re-opened. Now it only serves high-speed trains running between Shanghai and Nanjing, with a few ending at Suzhou, Wuxi, and Changzhou.

Metro station

A hub for 3 metro lines is under construction. An interchange station for Lines 11, 15, and 20 will be created. At present, Line 11 and Line 15 are operating and serves the station closest to Exit 1.

See also

Shanghai railway station
Shanghai Hongqiao railway station
Shanghai South railway station

References

External links

https://web.archive.org/web/20070303223311/http://www.shanghai-star.com.cn/Shanghai_Delta/Shanghai_Delta_news.asp?lv1=1&lv2=3&newsid=1711&viewsid=1711&views=23
http://www.shanghaidaily.com/sp/arti...cle_379371.htm

Putuo District, Shanghai
Railway stations in Shanghai
Stations on the Beijing–Shanghai Railway
Stations on the Shanghai–Kunming Railway
Stations on the Shanghai–Nanjing Intercity Railway
Railway stations in China opened in 1905
2006 disestablishments in China
Railway stations in China opened in 2010